Tangut Supplement is a Unicode block containing characters from the Tangut script, which was used for writing the Tangut language spoken by the Tangut people in the Western Xia Empire, and in China during the Yuan dynasty and early Ming dynasty. This block is a supplement to the main Tangut block.

The Tangut Supplement block size was changed in Unicode version 14.0 to correct the erroneous block end point (version 13:  → version 14.0).

Block

History
The following Unicode-related documents record the purpose and process of defining specific characters in the Tangut Supplement block:

See also 
 Tangut (Unicode block)
 Tangut Components (Unicode block)
 Ideographic Symbols and Punctuation (Unicode block)

References 

Unicode blocks
Tangut script